Neighborhoods is the second solo album by the jazz cornetist Olu Dara.

Track listing
"Massamba"
"Neighborhoods"
"Herbman"
"Strange Things Happen Everyday"
"Bell & Ponce (At the Movie Show)"
"I See the Light"
"Out on the Rolling Sea"
"Bluebird"
"Used to Be" – Olu Dara, Cassandra Wilson
"Red Ant (Nature)"
"Tree Blues"

References

2001 albums
Atlantic Records albums
Olu Dara albums